Obretenik Bastion (‘Rid Obretenik’ \'rid o-'bre-te-nik\ is the ice-covered buttress rising to 1932 m at the northeast extremity of Herbert Plateau on Danco Coast in Graham Land, Antarctica.  It is situated between upper Blériot Glacier and upper Cayley Glacier, and has steep and partly ice-free west, north and east slopes.

The buttress is named after the settlement of Obretenik in Northeastern Bulgaria.

Location
British mapping in 1978.

Maps
British Antarctic Territory. Scale 1:200000 topographic map. DOS 610 Series, Sheet W 64 60. Directorate of Overseas Surveys, Tolworth, UK, 1978.
 Antarctic Digital Database (ADD). Scale 1:250000 topographic map of Antarctica. Scientific Committee on Antarctic Research (SCAR). Since 1993, regularly upgraded and updated.

Notes

References
 Bulgarian Antarctic Gazetteer. Antarctic Place-names Commission. (details in Bulgarian, basic data in English)
 Obretenik Bastion. SCAR Composite Gazetteer of Antarctica

External links
 Obretenik Bastion. Copernix satellite image

Mountains of Graham Land
Bulgaria and the Antarctic
Danco Coast